The following is a list of notable people who were either born in, lived in, are current residents of, or are otherwise closely associated with or around the city of Bulawayo, Zimbabwe.

 John H Abeles, physician, medical investor, philanthropist
 Marshall P. Baron, painter
 Erich Bloch, economist and columnist
 Robin Brown, cricketer
 NoViolet Bulawayo, writer
 Warren Carne, cyclist
 Charlene, Princess of Monaco, wife of Albert II, Prince of Monaco
 Brian Chikwava, writer and musician
 Charles Coghlan, lawyer, first Premier of Southern Rhodesia; honoured by burial near Cecil Rhodes's grave, at "World's View" in the Matopo Hills near Bulawayo
 David Coltart, former Minister of Education, Sports, Arts and Culture (2008–2013)
 Charles Coventry, cricketer
 Kirsty Coventry, world-record swimmer
 Chelsy Davy, former girlfriend of Prince Harry
 Diana Dean, Canadian artist
 Graham Edwards, cricketer
 Lucia Evans, winner of the 2006 Irish TV talent show You're A Star, born in Bulawayo
 Stanley Fischer, governor of the Bank of Israel
 Duncan Fletcher, cricketer, former coach of England national cricket team and Indian national cricket team 
 Norman Geras, professor of political philosophy, University of Manchester and UK blogger (normblog)
 Humphrey Gibbs, GCVO, KCMG, farmer, Governor of the colony of Southern Rhodesia (1959–1970)
 Teenage Hadebe, footballer
 Elizabeth Haran, Australian novelist
 Graeme Hick, Zimbabwean-born English cricketer
 Jason Hitz, cricketer and rugby union player
 Kubi Indi, development activist and businesswoman
 Tendayi Jembere, actor
 Graham Johnson, pianist, recognised as one of the world's leading vocal accompanists;  world authority on the song repertoire
 Doris Lessing, novelist, recipient of the Nobel Prize in Literature
Dorothy Masuka, singer
 Keegan Meth, professional cricketer
 Cont Mhlanga, playwright and founder of Amakhosi Theater
 August Musarurwa, composer of the tune "Skokiaan"
 Benjani Mwaruwari, footballer and former Zimbabwe team captain; also played for Portsmouth FC
 Peter Ndlovu, footballer, former Zimbabwe team captain; considered to be the best Zimbabwean player of all time
 Marvelous Nakamba, footballer in the Premier League for Aston Villa and the Zimbabwe national team; born in Hwange, but raised in Bulawayo.
 Lewin Nyatanga, Zimbabwean-born Welsh footballer
 Alexander Pines, professor of chemistry, University of California, Berkeley
 Nick Price, former world number one golfer, World Golf Hall of Fame member
 Surendran Reddy, musician, composer and performer
 Rozalla, dance music performer
 Ron Sandler, CEO of Lloyd's of London; chairman of Northern Rock bank
 Allan Savory, biologist
 Shingai Shoniwa, rock musician
 Alexander McCall Smith, CBE, FRSE, writer and Emeritus Professor of Medical Law at the University of Edinburgh, Scotland; author of The No. 1 Ladies' Detective Agency series
 Joseph Sonnabend, physician, researcher, part of the team which discovered interferon
 Heath Streak, cricketer and former captain of Zimbabwe team; current bowling coach of the Bangladesh team
 Graeme Turner, cricketer
 Yvonne Vera, award-winning author
 Mike Williams, rugby player
David Houghton Former Zimbabwean cricketer and coach of Zimbabwean cricket team.
 Sean Williams, Zimbabwean cricketer

 
Bulawayo